Winter X Games XI were held from January 25, 2007 to January 28, 2007 in Aspen, Colorado.  They were the 6th consecutive Winter X Games to be held in Aspen.  Television coverage of Winter X Games XI was broadcast on ESPN and ABC, primarily hosted by Sal Masekela and Todd Harris.  Final attendance for the four-day event was 76,150.

Disciplines
Disciplines at the 11th Winter X Games were:

Skiing
Snowboarding
Snowmobiling

Results

Skiing
Men and Women's Monoski Cross

Men's Ski Cross

Women's Ski Cross

Men's Ski Slopestyle

Men's Ski SuperPipe

Women's Ski SuperPipe

Snowboarding
Men's Snowboard Best Trick

Men's Snowboard Cross

Women's Snowboard Cross

Men's Snowboard Slopestyle

Women's Snowboard Slopestyle

Men's Snowboard SuperPipe

Women's Snowboard SuperPipe

Snowmobiling
Snocross 

Snowmobile Freestyle

References

Winter X Games
2007 in multi-sport events
2007 in American sports
Sports in Colorado
Pitkin County, Colorado
2007 in Colorado
2007 in alpine skiing
2007 in snowboarding
Winter multi-sport events in the United States
International sports competitions hosted by the United States
January 2007 sports events in the United States